Aruán (Aroã) is an extinct Arawakan language of Brazil. Aikhenvald (1999) classifies it as a close relative of Palikur.

References

Arawakan languages
Languages of Brazil